DeVante Parker (born January 20, 1993) is an American football wide receiver for the New England Patriots of the National Football League (NFL). He was drafted by the Miami Dolphins in the first round in the 2015 NFL Draft. He played college football at Louisville.

Early years
Parker is the son of Raneca Parker and former Louisville running back Anthony Shelman. He attended Ballard High School in Louisville, Kentucky, where he was a three-sport star in football, track and basketball. He was a two-time All-State performer. He totaled 73 catches for 1,438 yards and 12 touchdowns as a junior.  He was named first-team All-State by The Courier-Journal. He recorded 209 yards and one touchdown against 6-A state champion Trinity, 137 and two touchdowns and 184 and two touchdowns in two games against No. 2  St. Xavier, 321 yards and two touchdowns against 6-A finalist Male and 227 yards and three touchdowns in just three quarters against 3-A state champion Central. He was named co-Paul Hornung Award winner as the state's top player with Boyle County's Lamar Dawson. He hauled in 68 passes for 1,793 yards (26.4 yards a catch) and 19 touchdowns as a senior, that ranks fourth all-time in state history. He finished his career as one of the state's all-time leading wide receivers with 3,274 yards, which ranks fifth only behind Somerset's John Cole (4,981), Lawrence County's Gerad Parker (4,736), Male's Montrell Jones (4,345) and Mason County's Chris Lofton (3,511).

In track & field, Parker lettered all four years for the Bruins competing as a sprinter. He earned a third-place finish in the 100-meter dash at the 2011 Male All Comers Meet, recording a personal-best time of 11.18 seconds. At the 2011 Class 3A Region 4 Championship, he posted a career-best time of 22.57 seconds in the 200-meter dash, placing 3rd, while also helping his 4x100 relay rank top in the state until defeated by rival Louisville Eastern High School at regionals and 4x200 relay squad placed first.

Recruiting
Parker was rated as the 26th-best wide receiver in the nation by Scout.com. He was ranked as the 77th-best wide receiver nationally by Rivals.com and the fifth-best player in the Rivals.com Kentucky postseason top 10. Parker chose Louisville over scholarship offers from Kentucky, Indiana and UCF.

College career

2011 season
As a true freshman in 2011, Parker appeared in 11 games. He finished sixth on the team with 18 receptions for 291 yards and led the team in touchdowns with six. He had two receiving touchdowns at USF. He also made a highlight-reel 39-yard touchdown reception in the season-opening win versus Murray State.

2012 season
As a sophomore in 2012, Parker played in all 13 games and led the team with 744 receiving yards and 10 touchdowns on 40 receptions. His 10 touchdown receptions were the most by a player in a season since 1998. He had a touchdown in six straight games to end the season. He had two games with two receiving touchdowns. He finished the season with two 100-yard-receiving games. He hauled in a 75-yard touchdown reception to start the second half of the Pittsburgh game.

2013 season

As a junior in 2013, Parker played in 12 of 13 games and had 55 receptions for 885 yards and a school record-tying 12 touchdowns. His 12 touchdowns were tied for 10th nationally and led the AAC. He recorded three 100-yard-receiving games. He tied a career-high with nine receptions for 142 yards and one touchdown in the Russell Bowl win over Miami. He had a career-best nine catches for 104 yards and two touchdowns in a road win over No. 23 Cincinnati. He finished with five catches for 71 yards and a score at UConn. He had two scoring catches and six catches overall for 74 yards against FIU. He had a season-high 134 yards receiving on five receptions and a pair of touchdowns against EKU.

2014 season
Parker missed the first seven games of his senior season in 2014 with an injury. He played in six games, recording 43 receptions for 855 yards and five touchdowns.

Collegiate statistics

Professional career

Miami Dolphins
Parker was drafted by the Miami Dolphins in the first round with the 14th overall pick in the 2015 NFL Draft.

2015 season
As a rookie, Parker appeared in 15 games and started four. In Week 12, against the New York Jets, he had his first professional receiving touchdown on a 33-yard reception from quarterback Ryan Tannehill. In the regular season finale, he posted five receptions for 106 receiving yards and a receiving touchdown against the New England Patriots. He recorded 26 receptions for 494 receiving yards and three receiving touchdowns.

2016 season
Parker started off his second professional season strong with eight receptions for 106 receiving yards against the New England Patriots in Week 2. Overall, he finished the season with 56 receptions for 744 receiving yards and four receiving touchdowns. He made his playoff debut in the Wild Card Round against the Pittsburgh Steelers. He had four receptions for 55 receiving yards in the 30–12 loss.

2017 season
In the 2017 season, Parker appeared in 13 games and started all of them but one. He totaled 57 receptions for 670 receiving yards and one receiving touchdown.

2018 season
On April 24, 2018, the Dolphins picked up the fifth-year option on Parker's contract. He had six receptions for a career-high 134 receiving yards in a loss to the Houston Texans in Week 8. In 11 games, Parker totaled 24 receptions for 309 receiving yards and one receiving touchdown.

2019 season
On March 12, 2019, Parker signed a new two-year contract with the Dolphins through the 2020 season. In Week 4 against the Los Angeles Chargers, Parker caught four passes for 70 yards and one receiving touchdown in the 30–10 loss. In Week 11 against the Buffalo Bills, Parker caught seven passes for 135 yards in the 37–20 loss. In Week 13 against the Philadelphia Eagles, Parker caught seven passes for 159 yards and two touchdowns in the 37–31 win. On December 13, 2019, Parker signed a four-year, $40 million contract extension with the Dolphins. In Week 16 against the Cincinnati Bengals, Parker caught five passes for 111 yards and a touchdown during the 38–35 overtime win. In Week 17 against the New England Patriots, Parker caught eight passes for 137 yards during the 27–24 win. Overall in the 2019 season, Parker had his most productive season to date, catching 72 passes for 1,202 yards and nine touchdowns, which are all career-highs.

2020 season
In Week 4 against the Seattle Seahawks, Parker recorded ten catches for 110 yards during the 31–23 loss. In Week 8 against the Los Angeles Rams, Parker caught the first career touchdown pass thrown by rookie quarterback Tua Tagovailoa during the 28–17 win. In Week 12 against the New York Jets, he had eight receptions for 119 receiving yards in the 20–3 victory. In Week 13 against the Cincinnati Bengals, Parker was ejected from the game after fighting Bengals players. He appeared in 14 games in the 2020 season, He recorded 63 receptions for  793 receiving yards and four receiving touchdowns.

2021 season
On November 5, 2021, Parker was placed on injured reserve with a hamstring injury. He was activated on December 4. In the 2021 season, Parker appeared in ten games and recorded 40 receptions for 515 receiving yards and two receiving touchdowns.

New England Patriots
On April 5, 2022, Parker was traded to the New England Patriots, along with a 2022 fifth-round pick, in exchange for a 2023 third-round pick. In Week 3, against the Baltimore Ravens, Parker had five receptions for 156 receiving yards in the 37–26 loss. In the following game, Parker scored his first touchdown as a Patriot in the 27–24 overtime loss to the Green Bay Packers. He finished the season with 31 catches for 539 yards and three touchdowns through 13 games.

NFL career statistics

Regular Season

References

External links

New England Patriots bio
Louisville Cardinals bio

1993 births
Living people
Players of American football from Louisville, Kentucky
African-American players of American football
American football wide receivers
Ballard High School (Louisville, Kentucky) alumni
Louisville Cardinals football players
Miami Dolphins players
21st-century African-American sportspeople
New England Patriots players